The Golden Bridge is a  pedestrian bridge in the Bà Nà Hills resort, near Da Nang, Vietnam. It is designed to connect the cable car station with the gardens (avoiding a steep incline) and to provide a scenic overlook and tourist attraction. The bridge loops nearly back around to itself, and has two giant hands, constructed of fibreglass and wire mesh, designed to appear like stone hands that support the structure.

The client for the project was the Sun Group. The bridge was designed by TA Landscape Architecture (under Ho Chi Minh City University of Architecture) based in Ho Chi Minh City. The company's founder, Vu Viet Anh, was the project's principal designer, with Trần Quang Hùng as the bridge designer and Nguyen Quang Huu Tuan as the bridge's design manager. Construction began in July 2017 and was completed in April 2018. The bridge opened in June 2018.

References

External links

Project description

2018 establishments in Vietnam
Bridges completed in 2018
Bridges in Vietnam
Buildings and structures in Da Nang
Outdoor sculptures in Vietnam
Pedestrian bridges in Vietnam
Stone sculptures in Vietnam
Tourist attractions in Da Nang